Volta Limburg Classic is a single-day road bicycle race held annually in late March or early April in Limburg, Netherlands. Since 2005, the race is organized as a 1.1 event on the UCI Europe Tour. Prior to 2012, the race was known as Hel van het Mergelland.

Winners

Men's race 
Source:

Women's race

References

External links
 

 
Cycle races in the Netherlands
UCI Europe Tour races
Recurring sporting events established in 1973
1973 establishments in the Netherlands
Cycling in Limburg (Netherlands)
South Limburg (Netherlands)